Simultaneous opposite direction parallel runway operations, or SODPROPS, is a method of coordinating the arrival and departure of aircraft on parallel runways. Airports that have two parallel runways can use this method so that aircraft can arrive on one runway while another aircraft can depart simultaneously in the opposite direction on the parallel runway. For example, an aircraft can depart runway 09R while another aircraft lands on runway 27R. This potentially maximizes the efficient coordination of aircraft in certain weather conditions as well as aiding in noise abatement.

Incidents
On January 15, 1997, at 6:30 am local time, simultaneous opposite-direction parallel runway operations were in use at Kingsford Smith International Airport in Sydney, Australia. An Airbus Industries A320-211 departed on runway 16L while an international Boeing 747 to the south was approaching runway 34L and because of this the Airbus A320 was required to turn left directly after takeoff to 115 degrees. However, the crew mistakenly dialed 155 degrees into the autopilot. After take off the crew realized they had set the incorrect heading and were maintaining 155 degrees. Air traffic control noticed the aircraft had not turned left but was unable to instruct them as the crew had transferred to the departure radio frequency where they were then instructed to turn to heading 115. The Pilot in Command of the Airbus A320 claimed to have the Boeing 747 in sight, however the crew of the 747 did not sight the Airbus A320. Neither aircraft breached distance separation standards for the SODPROPS approach, however an occurrence investigation was opened by the Australian Transport Safety Bureau.

See also
 Instrument landing system
 Air traffic control

References

Draft Parallel Runway Operating Plan, Brisbane Airport Corporation.Retrieved 2010-10-27
FAA Air Traffic Organization Policy. Retrieved 2010-10-27
Australian transport Safety Bureau-SODPROP Approach Incident Report 

Air traffic control